Gerald Mack House is a historic home in the town of Westfield in Chautauqua County, New York. It is a two-story, brick Greek Revival style dwelling with Italianate features, built around 1850. It features cast iron embellishments on the entrance, lintels, sills, porches and balconies.

It was listed on the National Register of Historic Places in 1983.

References

Houses on the National Register of Historic Places in New York (state)
Greek Revival houses in New York (state)
Italianate architecture in New York (state)
Houses completed in 1850
Houses in Chautauqua County, New York
National Register of Historic Places in Chautauqua County, New York